Max Saalmüller (26 November 1832  in Römhild, Germany – 12 October 1890 in Bockenheim) was a Prussian lieutenant colonel and German entomologist.

List of works

 Illustrations for Der Heerwurm of Ludwig Bechstein, 1851
 Mittheilungen über Madagaskar, seine Lepidopteren-Fauna, 1878 (in  News about Madagascar, its Lepidoptera fauna, 1878)
 Lepidopteren von Madagascar, 2 Bände, 1884/91 (in  Lepidoptera of Madagascar), 2 editions, 1884/1891
 Neue Lepidopteren aus Madagaskar, die sich im Museum der Seckenberg, in Bericht über die Senckenbergischen Naturforschende Gesellschaft'', 1879-1890,  pp. 258–310

References

External links

 www.nhm.ac.uk - National History Museum: Bibliographic record on Max Saalmüller
 

German lepidopterists
1832 births
1890 deaths